Government College University may refer to:

 Government College University, Faisalabad
 Government College University, Hyderabad
 Government College University, Lahore

See also
 Government College (disambiguation)